The discography of Ruby Lin, a Taiwanese singer, contains studio albums, Repackage albums, music videos, sound tracks and a number of other appearances.

In 1999 Lin entered the music industry with her first EP, "Hearings". Despite having only five songs the EP sold well in Hong Kong and Taiwan; it earned Lin several awards in Hong Kong, including Best Newcomer of the Year. The following year, TVB Solid Gold awarded her its Most Popular New Singer Award and Radio Television HK presented Lin with its Most Promising New Singer Bronze Award. However, due to a conflict between her record label and management company Lin began searching for a new label to produce her next album.

In 2001 (after a two-year hiatus) Lin signed a contract with BMG Taiwan and released her second album, face 2 face (雙面林心如). A few days later, the Para Para Special Edition was also released. Both albums received awards from the Hong Kong music industry. Following the two albums, Lin began focusing more on her acting career. Although she is under contract for four albums with BMG, Lin has little time to continue her singing career. As a result, in 2004 BMG released the soundtrack for the television series Half Life Fate rather than requiring Lin to record a third studio album. In the soundtrack, Lin sang five songs; the opening theme, "Half of Fate", earned her the Best Film and Television Song Award.
 At the end of 2004, Lin's contract with BMG expired. After being approached by several labels, she did not sign a contract until the spring of 2008. According to Lin, she signed with her new music company to further her musical career on the Chinese mainland.

At the end of November 2008 Lin returned to music after a further four-year break with her new album, New Rubyology(新如主義). This time, she took an active role in the production process – song selection, recording, and music-video planning – to create an album more representative of her character and style. Behind the album was a production team including Chinese musicians such as Chen Bao Guo and Chen Sun Hua, who previously worked with Jolin Tsai, Elva Hsiao, and Stefanie Sun. Fans and critics observed that Lin's new album showed a more mature and expressive singing technique. Her album cut "Onion Soup" (洋蔥濃湯) led the China Music Song Chart(中国歌曲联) for three weeks.
At the 12th M-Zone music award, Lin won the Golden Melody and Entertainer of the Year Awards.

Albums

Studio albums

Repackage (AVCD)

Soundtracks

Other appearances
Besides studio albums and soundtracks, Ruby Lin sang a number of promo songs, TV shows or movie theme songs which didn't appear on any album or soundtracks.

Music videos

Awards
 1999 Metro Radio Hits Music Awards New Singer Award
 1999 RTHK Top 10 Gold Songs Awards for Best new female prospect award
 1999 Jade Solid Gold Awards Presentation for Most Popular New Singer award (Bronze)
 2001 MTV Music Awards for Best Music Video of the Year
 2004 East Wind Music Award for Best Theme Song From TV Series
 2008 12th M-Zone Music Awards – Golden Melody Song of the Year, All-round Artist
 2009 (nominated) – Top Chinese Music Chart Award for Best Female Artist (Taiwan region)

References

External links 
 Ruby Lin Official Site
 Ruby Lin's Lyrics

Discography
Discographies of Taiwanese artists
Mandopop discographies